The 1988 McDonald's Bicentennial Youth World Cup was an international cricket tournament played in Australia from 28 February to 13 March 1988. Sponsored by McDonald's, it was the inaugural edition of what is now the Under-19 Cricket World Cup, and formed part of the celebrations for the Australian Bicentenary.

The tournament was primarily organised by the Australian Cricket Board (ACB), with only limited oversight from the International Cricket Conference (ICC). Eight teams participated, with the seven Test-playing ICC members joined by a composite team of players from ICC associate members. Australia defeated Pakistan in the final by five wickets, with England and the West Indies being the losing semi-finalists. The tournament play-offs were held at Adelaide Oval, with the other matches held at country venues in the states of New South Wales, South Australia, and Victoria. Australia's Brett Williams was the leading run-scorer at the tournament, while his teammate Wayne Holdsworth and Pakistan's Mushtaq Ahmed were the joint leading wicket-takers.

Squads
Players at the tournament had to be 18 years or younger on 1 January 1987, restricting participation to those born before 1 January 1968.

Round-robin

Points table

 Note: run rate (adjusted to a team's full allocation of overs if all out) was used as a tiebreaker if teams finished on an equal number of points, rather than net run rate (as is now common).

Matches

Finals

Semi-finals

Final

Notes

References

1988 in cricket
ICC Under-19 Cricket World Cup
1988 in Australian cricket
International cricket competitions in Australia
Sports competitions in Adelaide
Cricket in South Australia
Australian bicentennial commemorations
1980s in Adelaide
February 1988 sports events in Australia
March 1988 sports events in Australia